The 1998 Women's British Open Squash Championships was held at the National Indoor Arena in Birmingham from 27 March- 5 April 1998. The event was won by Michelle Martin for the sixth consecutive year defeating Sarah Fitzgerald for a third successive year in the final.

Seeds

Draw and results

First round

Second round

Quarter finals

Semi finals

Final

References

Women's British Open Squash Championships
Squash in England
Sports competitions in Birmingham, West Midlands
Women's British Open Squash Championship
1990s in Birmingham, West Midlands
Women's British Open Squash Championship
1998 in women's squash